Jordi Sort Viñas (born 1976) is a Catalan physicist working as an 'ICREA Research Professor' (Catalan Institution for Research and Advanced Studies) at the Autonomous University of Barcelona (UAB) in Spain leading the “Group of Smart Nanoengineered Materials, Nanomechanics and Nanomagnetism (Gnm3)” in the development of functional materials (thin films, nanoporous alloys and semiconductors, lithographed micro/nanostructures and nanocomposite/hybrid materials) for diverse applications. Sort received his PhD degree in Materials Science from UAB in 2002 (with qualification excellent cum laude, extraordinary award from UAB) later publishing more than 270 articles in peer-reviewed scientific journals that have received approximately 6600 citations.

Biography

Sort leads the “Group of Smart Nanoengineered Materials, Nanomechanics and Nanomagnetism (Gnm3)” at UAB, created in 2011 and now consisting of around 20 researchers (including Physicists, Chemists and Materials Science Engineers). The research activities of the group focus on the development of novel types of functional materials (thin films, nanoporous alloys and semiconductors, lithographed micro/nanostructures and nanocomposite/hybrid materials) for diverse applications (magnetic, mechanical, biomedical, catalytic), with an environmentally sustainable, cost-effective and energy efficient approach. Among his main scientific achievements, one can mention: (i) new approaches to control the magnetic behavior of materials at the sub-micrometer scale by non-magnetic means, i.e., taking advantage of local mechanical strain, ion irradiation/implantation or electric field (magneto-electrics), (ii) the discovery of a novel magnetization reversal mechanism called “exchange biased vortex” in circular magnetic structures with applications in magnetic data storage and spin-valves, (iii) the enhancement of the mechanical, magnetic and catalytic properties of environmentally-sustainable nanoporous materials for energy efficiency applications.

Sort received his PhD degree in materials science from UAB in 2002 (with qualification excellent cum laude, extraordinary award from UAB). The topic of his PhD dissertation was the improvement of the magnetic properties of permanent magnetic materials taking advantage of interfacial exchange interactions in mixed ferromagnetic-antiferromagnetic nanocomposites. During his postdoctoral stay at the SPINTEC Laboratory (Grenoble, France), from 2002 to 2004, he developed magnetic multilayered systems with perpendicular anisotropy for spin valves and magnetic tunneling spintronic applications. He subsequently stayed at Argonne National Laboratory (USA) (2005-2006), where he specialized in nanomagnetism and studied the so-called 'exchange biased magnetic vortices'. He also performed secondments at Los Alamos National Laboratory (USA) and the Grenoble High Magnetic Fields Laboratory (France).

Sort has published more than 270 articles in peer-reviewed scientific journals that have received approximately 6600 citations (h = 39). He has issued 5 patents, has been personally invited in more than 70 international conferences and has managed more than 25 national/international research projects. He is the recipient of a Consolidator Grant from the European Research Council (SPIN-PORICS) and the Coordinator of the SELECTA Marie Sklodowska-Curie Innovative Training Network (ITN-ETN) from the European Commission (Horizon2020). His current research aims at integrating engineered nanoporous materials into novel spintronic applications as well as replacing hazardous or toxic compositions in miniaturized devices and coatings with innovative environmentally-friendly materials.

From an academic point of view, Sort is actively involved in teaching, participating in different subjects from the physics and nanoscience degrees, the Master of Materials Science and Technology at UAB (which he coordinated during the period 2009–2011) and the Master of Nanotechnology and Materials Science. He was also the coordinator of the doctorate program in materials science at UAB during the period 2011–2014.

Prizes and Awards 
Sort has received the Jordi Porta i Jué's Prize awarded by the Catalan Physical Society (2000), the Young Researcher Award in Experimental Physics by the Spanish Royal Physical Society (2003) and, more recently, the Materials Science & Technology Prize from the Federation of European Materials Societies (FEMS) (2015). He also received the Extraordinary Award for his PhD Dissertation at UAB and was awarded the Young Scientific Prize at the ISMANAM Conference in Paris in 2005.

External links 

Scholar Google: https://scholar.google.es/citations?user=dL1kqukAAAAJ&hl=ca&oi=ao

References 

Living people
1976 births